Bonda is a deep-fried South Indian potato snack that has various sweet and savory versions in different regions. The most common is aloo bonda (potato bonda), and other region-specific variations include potato replaced with sweet potato,  tapioca, grated pineapple, green peas, paneer, or other ingredients.

History 
A recipe for bonda (as parika) is mentioned in Manasollasa, a 12th-century Sanskrit encyclopedia compiled by Someshvara III, who ruled from present-day Karnataka.

Preparation

The process of making a spicy bonda involves potato filling dipped in gram flour batter.

Bonda has a sweet and a spicy variant. 

Some regional variants in Kerala replace the potato with tapioca (tapioca bonda) or sweet potato and some onion, hard-boiled egg (mutta Bonda), masala, minced meat and other ingredients.

In Tamil Nadu, bonda is made from black gram (ulundu) batter.

In Andhra Pradesh it is known as poornalu.

Vegetable bonda is a dish of Udupi cuisine, where fresh green peas and other finely chopped vegetables like French beans, carrot and coriander leaves are used as filling. Goli baje or Mangalore bonda or Mangalore bajji is another variant from Karnataka. This bonda, however, is made from  maida flour (refined flour).

See also
Indian cuisine
Vada
Batata vada

References

External links

 Recipe: Aloo Bonda
 Recipe: Malabar Egg Bonda (Mutta Bonda)
 

Indian fast food
Karnataka cuisine
Telangana cuisine
Tamil cuisine
Snack foods
Potato dishes
Andhra cuisine
Deep fried foods